Lane House is an historic house in Edenton, North Carolina that is the oldest house in North Carolina identified by dendrochronology.

The -story house is located within the Edenton National Register Historic District. The earliest part was built 1718–19 and possibly moved to the site from nearby. The house is currently owned by Steve and Linda Lane. During renovations of the house, which they were using as a rental property, the contractor discovered older hand-hewn beams within the structure. Researchers from Williamsburg and elsewhere were contacted to conduct dendrochronological research on the building.

See also
List of the oldest buildings in North Carolina

References

Houses completed in 1729
Houses in Chowan County, North Carolina
Historic district contributing properties in North Carolina
National Register of Historic Places in Chowan County, North Carolina
Houses on the National Register of Historic Places in North Carolina
1729 establishments in North Carolina